Glenn Ljungström (born 7 September 1974) is a Swedish co-guitarist from Nödinge-Nol, for a band called The Resistance, since 2011. He was also an ex-guitarist and composer in a few other Swedish bands. He was most notably in heavy metal band In Flames from 1993 to 1997, for which he was also an original member. He quit In Flames to support his family with a more stable job. The other two bands that which he took part in 1995 were in HammerFall until 1997 and lastly a side project he co-founded with Jesper Strömblad called Dimension Zero, which he remained in until 2003, after which he quit that band as well.

Appearances

In Flames 
 Demo '93 (1993)
 Lunar Strain (1994)
 Subterranean (1995, EP)
 Artifacts of the Black Rain (1996, Video)
 The Jester Race (1996)
 Live & Plugged (1997, Split DVD)
 Black-Ash Inheritance (1997, EP)
 Whoracle (1997)
 Bullet Ride (2000, Compilation)

HammerFall 
 Glory to the Brave (1997, Full-Length)
 Glory to the Brave (1997, Single)
 On Tour (1999, EP)
 The First Crusade (1999, DVD)

Dimension Zero 
 Penetrations from the Lost World (1997, EP)
 Silent Night Fever (2001)
 This Is Hell (2003)

The Resistance 
 Rise From Treason (2013, EP)
 Scars (2013)

External links
 Dimension Zero website
 In Flames website

References

Living people
People from Gothenburg
Swedish heavy metal guitarists
1974 births
21st-century guitarists
HammerFall members
Dimension Zero (Swedish band) members
The Resistance (Swedish band) members
In Flames members